The Von Damm Hydrothermal Field is a field of hydrothermal vents located just south of Grand Cayman in the Caribbean, on the Mid-Cayman Rise in the Cayman Trough. The vent field is named in commemoration of geochemical oceanographer Karen Von Damm, who died in 2008.

The hydrothermal plume "Von Damm" was detected in 2010, with the site being visually confirmed later that year. Von Damm is of particular interest due to its location atop an ocean core complex associated with the Mid-Cayman spreading center. This exposes potential ultramafic rocks to seawater, hosting geochemical reactions unique to those of Beebe nearby and potentially similar to those of the Lost City Field.

By some, Von Damm is considered a new class of hydrothermal system (deviating from black smoker and alkaline systems) and may be a common occurrence.

Geography 

The Von Damm vent field is located centrally on the Mid-Cayman Rise between the Oriente and Swan Island transform faults. The ocean core complex, which the field resides on the eastern side of, is known as Mount Dent and is the most central of the three known on the spreading center. The other two being Mount Emms and Mount Hudson.

The field is composed of two main regions, north and south, on overlapping talc mounds linked by locations of diffuse flow.

Due to the proximity to the Cayman Islands, the Von Damm field falls under British jurisdiction.

Vents 

Vents plumes at the Von Damm vent field don't contain significant amounts of metals, so venting fluids lack the colors used to identify vents (black and white smokers). Most venting locations are covered in the shrimp Rimicaris hybisae, however. This makes them easier to identify by looking for dense patches of shrimp and shimmering water.

Northern Summit 
Vents at the northern end of the Von Damm Vent Field include the hottest observed in the entire vent field. These are less pronounced at nearby venting locations, such as White Castle, Ginger Castle, Arrow Loop, and Hotter than Hole.

Southern Mounds 
Further southeast are vents associated with longer-lived venting and tend to be cooler in temperature. Vent locations such as Old Man Tree, Shrimp Hole, X-15 and X18 are all venting at temperatures below .

Geochemistry 

The Von Damm vent field consists of talc mounds, which have exposed mafic or ultramafic rocks such as gabbros or peridotites containing the mineral olivine. Chimney structures at the Von Damm field are of varying shapes and sizes, but tend to also consist of talc precipitates. Upon discovery, this mineralogy was unique to Von Damm, as other vent fields displayed chimneys of calcium carbonate or metal sulfides.

Fluid chemistry at Von Damm has elevated concentrations of volatiles such as hydrogen, methane, and hydrogen sulfide. Formate has also been detected in high concentrations relative to deep seawater, which may be thermodynamically favored when fluids are mixed with seawater.

Biology 

The biology at the Von Damm vent field are similar to those found at the Beebe site to the north, though slightly more diverse. In addition to shrimp, squat lobsters, and anemones, Von Damm features extensive coverage of limpets over rocky faces, eelpout fish at venting areas, and tube worms similar to those observed in the Pacific. Tube worms have been detected in the vicinity of Shrimp Hole, which exhibits chemical characteristics more aligned to that of a methane seep.

An abundance of mussel shells have been observed at the Von Damm field. As with other vent fields, it is possible for deepwater sharks or roaming fishes such as grenadiers to appear around the field.

Microbiology 
In fluids sampled at the Von Damm field, Sulfurovum has been identified as a dominant bacteria and Methanothermacoccus have been identified as an abundant archaea. These organisms have been identified at both the Beebe and Von Damm sites of the Mid-Cayman Rise, though higher concentrations of reduced carbon species at Von Damm may be responsible for higher microbial diversity.

Similarities to other locations

Von Damm is a location which has much in common with other vents situated on ocean core complexes such as the Lost City field at the Atlantis Massif. However, Von Damm exhibits chimneys atop mounds consisting of talc. Geochemically, the field is somewhat of an intermediate between hot basalt and ultramafic systems with a more neutral pH.

Tube worms are a staple to many venting fields in the Pacific but are rarely found in the Atlantic, which has sparked interest from biologists regarding potential migrations between oceans for a variety of factors.

Gallery

References

External links 
 Von Damm in the Interridge Database
 The homepage for the 2011 Okeanos Explorer mission

Hydrothermal vents
Caribbean Sea